Patrick Matthew (20 October 1790 – 8 June 1874) was a Scottish grain merchant, fruit farmer, forester, and landowner, who contributed to the understanding of horticulture, silviculture, and agriculture in general, with a focus on maintaining the British navy and feeding new colonies.  He published the basic concept of natural selection as a mechanism in evolutionary adaptation and speciation in 1831 (i.e. resulting from positive natural selection, in contrast to its already, widely known, negative role in removal of individuals in the Struggle for Survival), but did not further develop or publicize his ideas. Consequently, when Charles Darwin later published On the Origin of Species in 1859, he and Alfred Russel Wallace were regarded by their scientific peers as having originated (independently of each other) the theory of evolution by natural selection; it has been suggested that Darwin and/or Wallace had encountered Matthew's earlier work, but there is no hard  evidence of this. After the publication of On the Origin of Species, Matthew contacted Darwin, who in subsequent editions of the book acknowledged that the principle of natural selection had been anticipated by Matthew's brief statement, mostly contained in the appendices and addendum of his 1831 book On Naval Timber and Arboriculture.

Life 
Patrick Matthew was born 20 October 1790 at Rome, a farm held by his father John Matthew near Scone Palace, in Perthshire. His mother was Agnes Duncan, a relative of Adam Duncan, 1st Viscount Duncan.—Patrick Matthew took over the management of Gourdiehill Estate and began in earnest to plant his orchards that would eventually grow to over 10,000 apple and pear trees and would become some of the finest in the entire British Empire .  In 1807 after coming of legal age and through the close relationship of his Mother Agnes Duncan  Gourdiehill was inherited by Patrick Matthew from Agnes Duncan's close relative... Admiral Adam Duncan the first Viscount Duncan of Camperdown who died in 1804.  Admiral Duncan inherited Gourdiehill, Auchmuir and Seaside estates upon the death of his older brother Alexander Duncan who previously inherited these 3 estates near the small village of Errol from his parents Helan Haldane of Gleneagles and Alexander Duncan,  Laird of Lundie, Provost of Dundee and in whose  family it had been...including his second oldest son Admiral Adam Duncan... for more than two hundred years. -->He was educated at Perth Academy and the University of Edinburgh, but did not graduate, as on his father's death and while only seventeen, he had to take over the responsibilities of managing and running the affairs of a property estate at Gourdiehill near Errol, Perth and Kinross in the Carse of Gowrie, between Perth and Dundee. Over the years he successfully nurtured, cultivated, and transformed much of the estate's farmland and pastures into several large orchards of apple and pear trees, numbering over 10,000.  He became an avid proponent as well as interested researcher of both silviculture and horticulture, both of which influenced his growing awareness of the forces of nature.  This awareness, along with his own experiences acquired from years of working his own modest estate would later frame a strong base of reference to form his own opinions and theories.

Between 1807 and 1831 (when On Naval Timber and Arboriculture was published) he periodically travelled to Europe, sometimes on business, sometimes seeking scientific enlightenment or agricultural or economic advice: a trip to Paris in 1815 had to be cut short when Napoleon returned from Elba. Between 1840 and 1850, Matthew travelled extensively in what is now northern Germany; recognising the commercial potential of Hamburg he bought two farms in Schleswig-Holstein.

Matthew married his maternal first cousin, Christian Nicol in 1817, and they had eight children: John (born 1818), Robert (1820), Alexander (1821), Charles (1824), Euphemia (1826), Agnes (1828), James Edward (1830), and Helen Amelia (1833). Robert farmed Gourdiehill in Patrick's old age, Alexander took over the German interests; the other three sons emigrated, initially to America. Matthew became interested in the colonisation of New Zealand and was instrumental in setting up a "Scottish New Zealand Land Company". At his urging, James and Charles Matthew emigrated to New Zealand, where they set up one of the earliest commercial orchards in Australasia using seed and seedlings from Gourdiehill. John Matthew remained in America, sending botanical tree specimens back to his father; these included (in 1853) the first seedlings known to have been planted in Europe of both the Giant Redwood (Sequoiadendron giganteum) and  the Coastal Redwood (Sequoia sempervirens). A group of trees of these species still thriving near Inchture in Perthshire comes from these seedlings.  Matthew gave many more seedlings to friends, relatives and neighbours, and redwoods can be found throughout the Carse of Gowrie; these as well as some elsewhere in Scotland (e.g. at Gillies Hill near Stirling Castle) are thought to have been grown from the 1853 seedlings. His reputation as a local celebrity faded in the twentieth century, when he was remembered as a "character" who at the end of his life became convinced that "someone very dear to his heart" had become a bird, and "that was the rizzen he wouldna allow the blackies to be shot in his orchard for fear they would shute her, ye ken, although the blackies were sair on the fruit".

Matthew's house, Gourdiehill, fell into disrepair in the 1970s and '80s, and was demolished in 1990 when the grounds became a small housing estate; some of the salvaged stone was incorporated in a rock garden.

Work 
In managing his orchards, Patrick Matthew became familiar with the problems related to the principles of husbandry in horticulture for food production (and hence, by extension silviculture).

Charles Darwin and natural selection
In 1860, Matthew read in the Gardeners' Chronicle for 3 March a review (by Huxley), republished from The Times, of Charles Darwin's On the Origin of Species, which said Darwin "professes to have discovered the existence and the modus operandi of natural selection, and described its principles". A letter by Matthew, published in the Gardeners' Chronicle on 7 April 1860, said that this was what he had "published very fully and brought to apply practically to forestry" in Naval Timber and Arboriculture in 1831, as publicised in reviews. He quoted extracts from his book, firstly the opening words of Note B from pages 364–365 of the Appendix, stopping before his discussion of hereditary nobility and entail.

He then quoted in its entirety a section from pages 381 to 388 of the Appendix. This lacked a heading, but in the Contents appeared as "Accommodation of organized life to circumstance, by diverging ramifications". In it, he commented on the difficulty of distinguishing "between species and variety". The change of the fossil record between geological eras implied living organisms having "a power of change, under a change of circumstances", in the same way as the "derangements and changes in organised existence, induced by a change of circumstance from the interference of man" gave "proof of the plastic quality of superior life" which he called "a circumstance-suiting power". Following past deluges, "an unoccupied field would be formed for new diverging ramifications of life" in "the course of time, moulding and accommodating their being anew to the change of circumstances". He proposed that "the progeny of the same parents, under great difference of circumstance, might, in several generations, even become distinct species, incapable of co-reproduction."

He described this as a "circumstance-adaptive law, operating upon the slight but continued natural disposition to sport in the progeny". Matthew then quoted the opening three paragraphs from Part III of his book, Miscellaneous Matter Connected with Naval Timber: Nurseries, pages 106 to 108, on "the luxuriance and size of timber depending upon the particular variety of the species" and the need to select seed from the best individuals when growing trees.

On reading this, Darwin commented in a letter to Charles Lyell dated 10 April:

Darwin then wrote a letter of his own to the Gardener's Chronicle, stating,

As promised, Darwin included a statement in the third (1861) and subsequent editions of On the Origin of Species, acknowledging that Matthew had anticipated "precisely the same view on the origin of species" and "clearly saw...the full force of the principle of natural selection". The statement referred to the correspondence, and quoted from a response by Matthew published in the Gardener's Chronicle. Darwin wrote that.

In June 1864, after visiting his son who was farming in Schleswig-Holstein, Matthew wrote to Darwin about his pamphlet publishing five of his letters. The title page of this political pamphlet by Matthew stated his claim to be "solver of the problem of species". In a letter to Hooker (22 and 28 October 1865), Darwin commented that William Charles Wells, in an essay "read in 1813 to Royal Soc. but not printed", had applied "most distinctly the principle of N. Selection to the races of man.— So poor old Patrick Matthew, is not the first, & he cannot or ought not any longer put on his Title pages 'Discoverer of the principle of Natural Selection'!."

Matthew's legacy in evolutionary studies
Matthew, Darwin and Wallace are the only three people considered to have independently discovered the principle of natural selection as a mechanism for speciation (macroevolution).  Others prior to Matthew had proposed natural selection as a mechanism for the generation of varieties or races within a species: James Hutton suggested the mechanism in 1794 as leading to improvement of varieties, and an 1813 paper by William Charles Wells proposed that it would form new varieties. In 1835, after Matthew's book, Edward Blyth published a description of the process as a mechanism preserving the unchanging essence of stable species.

Misconceived claims are made on behalf of Victorian evolutionists, with all the tedious inevitability that was predicted by Stephen Jay Gould in his piece on Natural Selection as a Creative Force,

The equally inevitable rebuttal of these claims tends to require an inordinately disproportionate investment of effort (see Earp 2016 for an explanation), sometimes only concluding after years of counterarguments (e.g., Roy Davies' The Darwin Conspiracy: Origins of a Scientific Crime). Unfortunately, the media coverage that accompanies these revisionist campaigns is the version most likely to be seen and remembered by the public, not the peer-reviewed paper appearing in the scientific literature a year later. The damage is therefore multifarious and insidious, from time lost to the individual, to misinforming the public en masse. Contrary to the stated intention, the unfortunate outcome of the latest claims made in Matthew's name might very well do more damage than good.

Modern claims for Matthew's priority
Although Darwin insisted he had been unaware of Matthew's work, some modern commentators have held that he and Wallace were likely to have known of it, or could have been influenced indirectly by other naturalists who read and cited Matthew's book.
 Ronald W. Clark, in his 1984 biography of Darwin, commented that Only the transparent honesty of Darwin's character... makes it possible to believe that by the 1850s he had no recollection of Matthew's work. This begs the question, for it assumes he did read Matthew's book. Clark continues by suggesting: If Darwin had any previous knowledge of Arboriculture, it had slipped down into the unconscious.
 In 2014, Nottingham Trent University criminologist Mike Sutton published in a non-peer-reviewed (i.e. not reviewed by experts in the field) proceedings a research paper that he presented to a British Society of Criminology conference proposing that both Darwin and Wallace had "more likely than not committed the world's greatest science fraud by apparently plagiarising the entire theory of natural selection from a book written by Patrick Matthew and then claiming to have no prior knowledge of it." On 28 May 2014 The Daily Telegraph science correspondent reported Sutton's views, and also the opinion of Darwin biographer James Moore that this was a non-issue (below). Sutton published a 2014 non-peer reviewed e-book Nullius in Verba: Darwin's Greatest Secret reiterating his argument, and alleging that "the orthodox Darwinist account" is wrong as "Darwin/Wallace corresponded with, were editorially assisted by, admitted to being influenced by and met with other naturalists who - it is newly discovered - had read and cited Matthew's book long before 1858".  Sutton included as one of these naturalists the publisher Robert Chambers, and said it was significant that the book by Matthew had been cited in the weekly magazine Chambers's Edinburgh Journal on 24 March 1832, then in 1844 Chambers had published anonymously the best selling Vestiges of the Natural History of Creation which, according to Sutton, had influenced Darwin and Wallace. In 2015, Sutton further repeated his assertion of "knowledge contamination" in the Polish journal, Filozoficzne Aspekty Genezy (F.A.G.) (Philosophical Aspects of Genesis), which Sutton asserts is peer-reviewed, and about which, one of the journal's editors responded, "As to Sutton, he cannot justifiably claim much credibility for his ideas just because these are published in such a journal like ours, i.e. one adopting Feyerabendian pluralism. If he thinks otherwise, it is only his problem. Any reasonable person should know better." In addition to his papers and e-book, Sutton disseminates his claims against Charles Darwin and Alfred Russel Wallace via several blog sites and Twitter accounts, and public lectures: to the Ethical Society, at the Conway Hall, on 27 July 2014; to the Teesside Skeptics in the Pub, at O'Connells Pub in Middlehaven, a ward of Middlesbrough, on 2 October 2014; and to the Carse of Gowrie Sustainability Group, at the James Hutton Institute, at Craigiebuckler, Aberdeen, on 17 March 2016.

However, there is no direct evidence that Darwin had read the book, and his letter to Charles Lyell stating that he had ordered the book clearly indicates that he did not have a copy in his extensive library or access to it elsewhere. The particular claim that Robert Chambers had read and transmitted Matthew's ideas that are relevant to natural selection is also not supported by the facts. The article in the Chambers's Edinburgh Journal (1832, vol. 1, no. 8, 24 March, p. 63) is not a review but only an abridged excerpt from pp. 8–14 of On Naval Timber that amounts to no more than a recipe for pruning and contains nothing of relevance to natural selection. It is headed "ON THE TRAINING OF PLANK TIMBER" and ends with ".— Matthew on Naval Timber." Even if it had been penned by Robert Chambers, this does not mean that he had read or understood, leave alone transmitted, the other passages of Matthew's book that do contain anything relevant to natural selection. Further, The Vestiges of the Natural History of Creation contain nothing of relevance about natural selection. Combining these facts, Robert Chambers had probably not read or received the message about natural selection in Matthew's book, but has surely not promulgated it in the Vestiges, and probably neither in conversations.

Rebuttal of claims 
Challenges to Matthew's claim to priority, or those made since he died, have essentially made reference to the same issues, that his description of natural selection was not accessible and it lacked lengthier development. Other criticisms have focussed on the differences between Darwin's and Matthew's versions of natural selection, and sometimes Wallace's too (e.g., Weale 2015). If Matthew's ideas had made the impact on subsequent evolutionary thinking, as claimed, the signals ought to be there, either during Matthew's lifetime, or Darwin's. Yet, modern claims for Matthew's priority have been unable to provide evidence for this, that has withstood fact checking.

Accessibility and development 
Historian of science, Peter Bowler succinctly summarised some of those main reasons given for why Matthew does not deserve priority for natural selection over Darwin and Wallace,

Ernst Mayr's opinion was even more clear-cut:

Richard Dawkins also grants that Matthew had grasped the general concept of natural selection, but failed to appreciate the significance, nor develop it further,

In response to Sutton's  e-book, Darwin biographer James Moore said many people came towards a similar perception during the 19th century, but Darwin was the only one who fully developed the idea:

In response to Sutton (2015) Darwin and Wallace scholar, John van Wyhe commented, 

To coincide with Sutton's presentation to the Carse of Gowrie Sustainability Group, Darwin author, Julian F. Derry sent an open letter, saying,

Biological concepts 

The History of Science website Natural Histories has compiled a comprehensive series of blog posts on Patrick Matthew that have made a close study of his writings, while importantly ensuring an appropriate historical context. The resulting pieces of evidence largely contradict Sutton's claims. This is especially so from a biological context, one that compares and evaluates core differences between Matthew's and Darwin's concepts, especially that relating to relative adaptation (Matthew's power of occupancy), and diversification as an adaptive process (Darwin's principle of divergence),

This exculpates Darwin for the time from his return from the Beagle voyage till 1844. Hence, the period for which there is no evidence that Matthew's ideas are present in Darwin's work, the records of his development of ideas, and expression of those concepts in his writing can be shown to extend from the time he was leaving for the Beagle voyage, up until the coalescence of his ideas into his cohesive system of evolution by natural selection in 1858. Niles Eldredge, points out the very valid point that seeing Matthew's descriptions at any point during that extended period, would likely have resulted in an integral, preformed model being described by Darwin from the outset, whereas what we actually have in his notes is realisation of the full picture from development of incremental sketches,

Analysis of comparative speciation concepts 

Sutton's claim that Darwin and Wallace plagiarised evolution by natural selection from Matthew also has been refuted by Joachim Dagg,
[Wallace's] concept of lineage-adaptation as a sequence of extinctions of less fit and survival of fitter varieties and his gradualism put him closer to Darwin than to Matthew. But he emphasized environmental changes for differential extinction and some form of isolation for lineage-splitting and speciation, whereas Darwin's mature theory saw competition as a sufficient cause of divergence, differential extinction, lineage-adaptation and lineage-splitting. This is not to say that Darwin was right in this view and Wallace wrong. By current standards, they were both right and wrong in different respects (competitive vs. environmental selection, sympatric vs. allopatric speciation).
The perspective emerging from this comparison shows at least four unique theories (Matthew, early Darwin, mature Darwin and Wallace), each interesting in its own right. Each theory integrated change in conditions, variability, competition and natural selection in ways that allowed for species transformation somehow. Apart from this similarity, the theories differ significantly from each other in the mechanisms underlying transformation. However, this difference does not lie in the struggle for survival and survival of the fittest, but in the way in which natural selection is integrated with variability, competition and environmental conditions. Transmutation is a convergent result of structurally different mechanisms.
The similarity of Matthew's scheme to the theory of punctuated equilibria is equally superficial. Eldredge & Gould (1972) took Mayr's model of allopatric speciation and combined it with Wright's model of genetic drift in order to explain gaps in the fossil record as results of relatively swift evolutionary change in small and isolated populations. Although catastrophes can produce such populations they are not required, and the mechanism underlying the punctuated record is the drift within small and isolated populations, not the absence of competing species that would prevent species transmutation. Therefore, viewing Matthew (1831) as an anticipator of the theory of punctuated equilibria (e.g. Rampino, 2011) is as wrong as claiming his scheme identical to Darwin's or Wallace's.

Matthew's contemporaries
Accepting these irreconcilable differences in theory, a remaining route has been proposed, by which Darwin may have got to gain knowledge of Matthew's evolutionary ideas, that is, by knowledge being passed along a network of associates, by word of mouth, or an equally indirect pathway, such as via the influence of an editor. Evidence that such a network existed could be found if there was documentation of anyone having discussed Matthew's ideas on evolution. However, there is no single contemporary record of anyone having even recognised any value in Matthew's concept. Of the three sources to mention the existence of evolutionary content in On Naval Timber, two were rejections.

 Prideaux John Selby wrote,

 while an anonymous reviewer in the United Service Journal and Naval and Military Magazine wrote,
{{blockquote|we disclaim participation in his rumination on the law of Nature, or on the outrages committed upon reason and justice by our burthens of hereditary nobility, entailed property, and insane enactments<ref name="USJNMM (1831)">Anon. (1831) "The United Service Journal and Naval and Military Magazine, 1831 part II. London: Colburn and Bentley. pp. 457-466.</ref>}}

 The other was in a review where the writer, assumed to be John Claudius Loudon, confesses to being confused,

Darwin's contemporaries
While completing a doctoral thesis on Disputes of Plagiarism in Darwin's Theory of Evolution at the University of Zielona Gora, where the journal Filozoficzne Aspekty Genezy (F.A.G.) (Philosophical Aspects of Genesis) is based, Grzegorz Malec published a critical review of Sutton (2015), in which the main difficulty of valid identification of communication pathways was discussed, along with observations on Sutton's alternative approach,Natural Histories analysed the set of pathways that Sutton claims could have conveyed information on evolution from Matthew to Darwin and Wallace, also noting the same arbitrary determinism detected by Malec (above), they explain that,

 [Sutton] mistook the translation of a Swiss-French pastor's failure to teach his peasants proper potato cultivation with Matthew's observations on self-thinning in forest rejuvenations (Ellerby 1832).
 He failed to check whether anything in Matthew (1831) could be from non-English sources (Conrad 1834, Roget 1834).Roget, P. M. (1834) The Bridgewater Treatise on the Power, Wisdom and Goodness of God As Manifested in the Creation. Treatise V. Animal and Vegetable Physiology. London, Pickering.
 He mistook a rant by Rafinesque (1836) against the Linnean system for a rant of Matthew against the poor selection regimes of nurserymen.
 He mistook political rants for biological ones (see Wilson 1837).
 He mistook a theatre critique with a scientific piece (Anon. 1837).
 He failed concerning an ostensibly anonymous translation, that was neither a translation nor even contained the phrase in question (Anon. translator 1842). Note: Sutton mis-references this as 1838.
 He mistook poor selection regimes with hybridization (Armstrong and Buel 1840).
 He mistook an anecdote about a parlor games with the competitive advantage of established trees (Rush & Butler 1840). Sutton wrongly attributes this to the periodical's owner-editor, Conrad Swackhamer.
 He mistook the failure of a contemporary (i.e., Selby 1842) to get Matthew's idea as a proof that Selby did get Matthew's idea. Furthermore, Selby doesn't actually ever use the phrase as claimed by Sutton.
 He mistook law-stuff with natural history (Alabama Supreme Court 1846).
 He mistook an editor and re-publisher for the original author. Sutton cites Wilkin (1852) which is an edited collected works, within which the matching phrase occurs, in Browne (1658).
 He mistook the worst that's ever been published on education with the best that's been published on natural history (see Andrews 1853).
 He mistook a piece on language and historiography with one on natural history (see Mure 1854).
 He mistook cultural (religious) causes with natural (ecological) ones (see Fishbourne 1855).
 He took a review of Baden Powell's 1857 essay, Christianity without Judaism on theology to be an original natural history source. Joseph Hooker commented on how parsons such as Powell, are so in the habit of dealing with the abstractions of doctrines as if there was no difficulty about them whatever, a criticism that could be levied at others who wander outside their academic and intellectual limits.
 He mistook an account of a spiritualist ranting about the polygamy of Mormons and the celibacy of Shakers with science (see Hallock 1858).
 He mistook communicating member's report of a debate about neurophysiology involving Hartshorne (1858) with an original statement by Leidy and took it to be on natural history.

 Natural theology 
Writing to Darwin in 1871, Matthew enclosed an article he had written for The Scotsman and, as well as wishing that he had time to write a critique of The Descent of Man, and Selection in Relation to Sex, expressed the belief that there is evidence of design and benevolence in nature, and that beauty cannot be accounted for by natural selection. Such a belief is mainstream natural theology, and reveals how far Matthew was from Darwin in realising the potential of evolutionary explanations: for him as well as others, man was the sticking-point.

There is little or no evidence that Matthew held these views as a younger man: there is no discussion of a religious nature in Arboriculture.

 Socio-political views 
Matthew's idea on society were radical for their times. Although he was a landowner, he was involved with the Chartist movement, and argued that institutions of hereditary nobility were detrimental to society. It has been suggested that these views worked against acceptance of his theory of natural selection, being politically incorrect at the time (see Barker, 2001). The more likely reason is that the obscurity of the location hid the ideas from many who would have been interested. Only after Darwin's Origin did Matthew come forward in a popular journal, the Gardeners' Chronicle. Matthew also published a book in 1839, Emigration Fields (Black, Edinburgh), suggesting that overpopulation, as predicted by Malthus, could be solved by mass migration to North America and the Dominions.

Matthew supported the invasion of Schleswig-Holstein by Bismarck in 1864: his pamphlet on the event was denounced by the Dundee Advertiser. He also supported the Germans against the French in the Franco-Prussian War (1870–71), a war which marked the final unification of the German Empire and the end of the Second French Empire.

In 1870 Matthew became aware of the terrible housing conditions of the workers in Dundee. In a letter to the Dundee Advertiser he told readers that the death rate of children under five in the town was 40%, and outlined a blueprint for the redevelopment of the city.

 The Tay bridge 
When the Edinburgh and Northern Railway (E&N) and the Dundee and Perth Railway (D&P) were seeking Parliamentary approval in 1845, it was proposed by their engineers that from Perth both should share a line running along the south bank of the Tay as far as Newburgh, where the D&P would cross to the north bank, and the E&N leave the Tay and head south to a ferry crossing of the Forth.  Matthew had been in a very small minority supporting this, and the D&P as built crossed the Tay at Perth. In 1864, when a bridge crossing the Tay at Dundee was proposed, Matthew urged that a bridge at Newburgh was preferable to a bridge at Dundee, a Newburgh bridge giving much the same reduction in the rail distance between Dundee and the Forth ferry-ports from which passengers could cross to Edinburgh as a bridge at Dundee but doing so by a shorter (and therefore cheaper) crossing of the Tay.  He argued the costs of a Dundee bridge were being grossly under-estimated: "To erect a substantial bridge, not a flimsy spectral thing, which might or not vanish as a phantom the first storm, or break down under the vibration caused by a heavy, rapid, moving train, would, in my opinion cost nearly double, and probably much more than double, the sum the Engineer states; upon this I stake my judgement against that of the Engineer", noting in passing, "from the geological indices, I would expect the foundation to be more regular at Newburgh than at Dundee, consequently better".

The financial crisis of 1866 put an end to the 1864 Tay Bridge proposal, but it was revived in 1869.  Matthew responded with a series of letters to the Dundee papers arguing for a Newburgh bridge, and advancing all manner of additional arguments against a Dundee bridge; it would have a deleterious effect on silting and tidal scour in the Firth; it would prevent navigation upstream of it; it would be torn apart by the centrifugal force from heavy trains rapidly descending the curve at its northern end; it was vulnerable to earthquake, a ship colliding with a pier, or to high wind.

Matthew's objections were not heeded, and were not persisted in once Parliament had passed the Bill authorising construction of the Tay Bridge.  During construction of the bridge some of Matthew's criticisms were borne out: it became apparent that bedrock could not be found at a depth allowing the use of brick piers; the design had to be modified to use lattice-work iron piers of reduced width, and there was considerable cost overrun. The  bridge opened in June 1878 and was destroyed in a storm in December 1879: the lattice work piers supporting the centre section of the bridge (the high girders) failed catastrophically as a train was crossing the bridge.  The high girders and the train fell into the Tay and about seventy-five lives were lost. Whilst it was recalled in the immediate aftermath of the disaster that Matthew had predicted collapse in a high wind as one of the horrible ends to which a bridge at Dundee could come, the disaster is generally ascribed to defects in the design and manufacture of the lattice work piers introduced into the design well after Matthew's campaign against the bridge.

See also
 Evolution
 History of evolutionary thought
 Natural selection
 Tay Bridge disaster
 William Charles Wells

Notes
Notes

Citations

References
 Barker, J.E. (2001). Patrick Matthew—Forest Geneticist (1790–1874), Forest History Today.
 Dempster, W.J. (1996). Natural selection and Patrick Matthew: evolutionary concepts in the nineteenth century. The Pentland Press, Edinburgh.
 

 
 Sutton, M. (2014). The hi-tech detection of Darwin's and Wallace's possible science fraud: Big data criminology re-writes the history of contested discovery, Papers from the British Criminology Conference''. Vol. 14: 49-64 Panel Paper. The British Society of criminology.  Accessed July 2015. But see Dagg (2018).
Weale, M. E. (2015), Patrick Matthew's law of natural selection., Biological Journal of the Linnean Society. doi:10.1111/bij.12524 Accessed April 2015

External links 

 
Patrick Matthew Biography – UC Berkeley
The Patrick Matthew Project – Links to Matthew's writings
Natural Selection as a Creative Force by Stephen Jay Gould

Patrick Matthew.com
Critique of "Nullius in Verba: Darwin’s Greatest Secret"
Article exploring the question of whether Patrick Matthew independently discovered natural selection

1790 births
1874 deaths
Catastrophism
Charles Darwin
Chartists
Scottish farmers
Proto-evolutionary biologists
Pre-Darwinian publications in evolutionary biology
19th-century Scottish people
People educated at Perth Academy
Alumni of the University of Edinburgh
Scottish science writers
People from Perth and Kinross
Scottish letter writers
Scottish landowners
Scottish agriculturalists
19th-century Scottish businesspeople